The 1957–58 season was Real Madrid Club de Fútbol's 55th season in existence and the club's 27th consecutive season in the top flight of Spanish football.

The season saw Real Madrid win the continental double, clinching the European Cup for the third time in a row, and get agonizingly close to clinching its first ever treble, only to be defeated by Athletic Bilbao in the Copa del Generalísimo final.

Summary
The club signed 1955–56 French league champion manager Luis Carniglia as its new head coach. New arrivals for the team were goalkeeper Rogelio Domínguez, a champion with Argentina at the 1957 Copa América, and from Nacional de Montevideo Uruguayan defender José Emilio Santamaría, who played at the 1954 FIFA World Cup and brought attention due to his style of play. These two signings were crucial to boost the defense of the team with an impressive 26 goals conceded during 30 matches in the Spanish league, helping also the offensive line wherein Alfredo Di Stéfano and his 19 goals clinched another league top scorer trophy, this time tied with Manuel Badenes (Real Valladolid) and Ricardo Alós (Valencia) .

The team, with an excellent balance in defense and offense, won its sixth Spanish league title, finishing 3 points above Atlético Madrid despite a bad row of results during the winter. Also, the squad clinched its third consecutive European Cup defeating A.C. Milan 3–2 after extra time at Heysel. After clinching the two trophies, Madrid's attention turned to the Copa del Generalísimo with hopes of becoming the first team in the world to clinch the continental treble. Real Sociedad was defeated convincingly to set up the final against Bilbao at the Bernabéu. Playing at home in front of 100,000 spectators with the treble on the line, Madrid were shut down by Athletic, losing 0–2. Real Madrid continued its unlucky run of losing Copa finals. As of 2022, the club has never won a treble, with its next closest attempt coming four years later.

Squad

Transfers

Competitions

La Liga

League table

Position by round

Matches

Copa del Rey

Round of 16

Quarter-finals

Semi-finals

Final

European Cup

First round

Quarter-finals

Semi-finals

Final

Statistics

Squad statistics

Players statistics

References
 BDFútbol

Real Madrid CF seasons
Real Madrid
Spanish football championship-winning seasons
UEFA Champions League-winning seasons